Maurice Moucheraud (28 July 1933 – 13 January 2020) was a road racing cyclist from France, who won the gold medal in the men's team road race at the 1956 Summer Olympics, alongside Arnaud Geyre and Michel Vermeulin. He was a professional rider from 1957 to 1962.

References

External links
 
 

1933 births
2020 deaths
French male cyclists
Cyclists at the 1956 Summer Olympics
Olympic cyclists of France
Olympic gold medalists for France
Olympic medalists in cycling
Sportspeople from Marne (department)
Medalists at the 1956 Summer Olympics
Cyclists from Grand Est